The following is a list of notable people from and/or related to Nagpur, India.

Academia
 Surendra Sheodas Barlingay (1919–1997), logician and Marathi writer
 Vidyadhar Johrapurkar, Sanskritist, social anthropologist and historian
 D. Raghavarao (1938–2013), Indian statistician, known for his contributions in design of experiments
 Sharadchandra Shankar Shrikhande (1917–2020), mathematician

Activism, civil rights, and philanthropy
 Moreshwar Vasudeo Abhyankar (1886–1935), lawyer and freedom fighter
 Nirmala Deshpande (1929–2008), social activist
 Amruta Fadnavis, social activist and banker
 Shankar Mahale (1925-1943), young revolutionary
 R. K. Patil (1907–2007), Gandhian and freedom fighter
 Ram Puniyani, communal harmonist
 Varun Shrivastava, Social Activist

Art, literature
 Gopalakrishna Adiga (1918–1992), Kannada poet
 Raja Badhe (1912–1977), Marathi poet
 Suresh Bhat (1932–2003), Marathi poet and Ghazal Samrat
 Purushottam Bhaskar Bhave (1910–1980), Marathi writer
 Neelam Saxena Chandra, children's poet and author
 Eknath Easwaran (1910–1999), author and spiritual teacher
 Mahesh Elkunchwar, playwright and author
 Vasudeo S. Gaitonde (1924–2001), abstract painter
 Ram Ganesh Gadkari (1885–1919), Marathi poet
 Manik Sitaram Godghate (Grace) (1937–2012), Marathi poet
 Dhanashree Halbe, translator, poet and children's author
 Gauri Jog, Kathak dancer
 Shahid Kabir (1932–2001), Urdu language poet
 Akshaykumar Kale, modern Marathi poetry critic
 Indra Bahadur Khare (1922–1953), Hindi poet and writer
 Vishnu Bhikaji Kolte (1908–1998), Marathi writer; former Vice-Chancellor of Nagpur University
 Bhau Panchbhai (1944–2016),  Marathi poet, writer, and Dalit activist 
 Harishankar Parsai (1924–1995), Hindi writer
 Wasudev Waman Patankar (1908–1997), Marathi Shayar
Shishir Parkhie - Ghazal Singer & Composer

Business
 Jamnalal Bajaj (1889–1942), founder of Bajaj Group of industries
 Sanjay Bhende, Chairman of Nagarik Sahakari Bank Ltd, Nagpur
 Dinesh Keskar, President of Boeing Asia and Vice-President of Boeing International
 Sanjay Kirloskar, Chairman of Kirloskar Brothers Ltd
 Vikram Pandit, former chief executive of Citigroup
 Subramaniam Ramadorai, Vice-Chairman of Tata Consultancy Services

Indian Film Industry

 Jyoti Amge, actress
 Tarun Bose (1928–1972), actor
 Basanta Choudhury (1928–2000), actor
 Purushottam Darvhekar (1926–1999), playwright and songwriter
 Vaishnavi Dhanraj, television actress
 Mahesh Elkunchwar, playwright
 Subhash Ghai, film director, producer and screenwriter
 Sai Gundewar, actor
 Samidha Guru, Marathi theater, film and television actress 
 Sharman Joshi, actor
 Rajkumar Hirani, film director, screenwriter and film editor
 Gayatri Joshi, model turned Bollywood actress
 Abhijit Kokate, film editor and Director in Bollywood
 Ketaki Mategaonkar, Marathi playback singer and Marathi cinema actress
 Jag Mundhra (1948–2011), Indian filmmaker
 Manava Naik, actress
 Salim Nasir (1944–1989), Pakistani actor
 Girija Oak, Marathi and Hindi film actress
 Shiv Panditt, Bollywood actor
 Piyush Ranade, Marathi film & television actor
 Ronit Roy, television actor
 Ruchi Savarn, television actress
 Aarti Shrivastava, documentary filmmaker
 Sunaina, Tamil actress
 Vaibbhav Tatwawdi, Marathi actor
 Sanjay Surkar (1959–2012), Marathi film director
 Paras Kalnawat, Indian Hindi television and web actor

Health and medicine
 Kamalabai Hospet (1896–1981), co-founder of Matru Sewa Sangh, and Vidya Shikshan Prasarak Mandal
 Vikram Marwah, orthopedic surgeon, social worker, and founder of Handicapped Children's Rehabilitation Centre and Children's Orthopedic Hospital of Matru Sewa Sangh
 Dr. Kshama Metre, founder of Chinmaya Organization for Rural Development
Zulekha Daud, physician-turned-entrepreneur, Founder and Chairperson of Zulekha Healthcare Group, including Zulekha Hospital UAE; Alexis Multispeciality Hospital, India and Zulekha Colleges, India

Law
 Justice Sharad Arvind Bobde, 47th Chief Justice of India, Supreme Court of India
 Bipin Krishna Bose (1851–1933), advocate
 Siraj Mehfuz Daud (1931–2010), Judge and senior advocate
 S. P. Kotval (1910–1987), Chief Justice of the Bombay High Court
 Ruma Pal, retired Justice of the Supreme Court
Ananda Prakash Sen (1923–?), Justice of the Supreme Court of India
Harish Salve, solicitor general of India(1999-2002), senior advocate

Military and policing
 Shirish Baban Deo, Vice Chief of the Air Staff of the Indian Air Force
 Suryakant Chintaman Chafekar, Air Vice Marshall
 Edgar Peacock (1893–1955), decorated British Army officer
 Hemant Karkare (1954–2008), chief of the Mumbai Anti-Terrorist Squad
 Ghulam Mansoor Subedar-major and scholar

Modeling
 Manasi Moghe, Miss India Universe 2013
 Lopamudra Raut, model and Miss United Continents 2016
 Madhu Sapre, Miss India Universe 1992

Music

 Varsha Bhosle, (1956 - 2012) singer and journalist 
 Vasantrao Deshpande (1920–1983), Hindustani classical vocalist and performer of Natya Sangeet
 Ulhas Kashalkar, Hindustani classical vocalist
 Shishir Parkhie, playback ghazal bhajan singer and composer
 Avinash Balkrishna Patwardhan, musicologist
 Rahul Vaidya, singer
 Altaf Raja, singer
 Pandit Sudhir, sitar player of Hindustani classical music
 Usha Timothy, playback singer
 Vidyadhar Vyas, Hindustani classical vocalist

Politics and government
 Madhav Shrihari Aney (1880–1968), politician
 Mohite Subodh Baburao, member of 14th Lok Sabha
 Ardhendu Bhushan Bardhan (1924–2016), politician
 C. B. Bhave, financial regulator
 Raghoji I Bhonsle (1695–1755), Maratha general who took control of the Nagpur Kingdom in east-central India during the reign of Chattrapati Shahu
 Mudhoji II Bhonsle (?–1840), ruler of the Kingdom of Nagpur
 Raghuji Bhonsle III (c.1806–1853), ruler of the Principal States of Nagpur from 1818 to 1853.
 Gangadhar Rao Chitnavis (1862–?), President of First and Second Legislative Council of Central Provinces
 Shankar Madhav Chitnavis (1867–?), Deputy commissioner of Central Provinces
 Swati Dandekar, Democratic member of the Iowa Utilities Board
 Pravin Datke, former mayor of Nagpur, current BJP Nagpur City president
 Bhavna Kardam Dave, member of 12th Lok Sabha
 Narendra R Deoghare, member of 4th Lok Sabha
 Madhukar Dattatraya Deoras (1915–1996), third Sarsanghchalak of the Rashtriya Swayamsevak Sangh
 Ashish Deshmukh, member of 13th Maharashtra Legislative Assembly
 Ranjeet Deshmukh, member of 10th Maharashtra Legislative Assembly
 Sudhakar Deshmukh, member of 13th Maharashtra Legislative Assembly
 Devendra Fadnavis, Former Chief Minister of Maharashtra 
 Parinay Fuke, member of Maharashtra Legislative Council
 Nitin Gadkari, Union Minister and former President of the Bharatiya Janata Party
 Ramchandra Martand Hajarnavis, councillor and member of 4th Lok Sabha
 K. B. Hedgewar (1889–1940), founding Sarsanghachalak of the Rashtriya Swayamsevak Sangh.
 Justice Mohammad Hidayatullah (1905–1992), Vice-President of India; former Chief Justice of India
 Shrikant Jichkar (1953–2004), politician, civil servant
 Sanjay Joshi, politician of the Bharatiya Janata Party, former national general secretary (organisation)
 Narayan Bhaskar Khare (1884–1970), member of Indian National Congress
 Jogendra Kawade, founder and President of Peoples Republican Party
 Saroj Khaparde, member of Rajya Sabha
 Krishna Khopde, member of the 13th Maharashtra Legislative Assembly
 Vikas Kumbhare, member of the 13th Maharashtra Legislative Assembly
 Vikas Mahatme, member of the Rajya Sabha
 Milind Mane, member of the 13th Maharashtra Legislative Assembly
 Sameer Meghe, member of the 13th Maharashtra Legislative Assembly
 Gargi Shankar Mishra, member of 8th Lok Sabha
 Rajendra Mulak, former Minister of State for Finance & Planning, Energy, Water Resources, Parliamentary Affairs and State Excise
 Vilas Muttemwar, former Minister of State of the Ministry of New and Renewable Energy of India
 Avinash Pandey, member of the Maharashtra Legislative Assembly
 Vinod Gudadhe Patil, former Minister in Narayan Rane ministry
 Shantaram Potdukhe,  former Member of Parliament and Union Minister of State, Finance
 Rajani Rai, former Lieutenant Governor of Pondicherry
 P. V. Narasimha Rao (1921–2004), former Prime Minister of India
 Nitin Raut,  Energy Minister
 N. K. P. Salve (1921–2012), Minister of State and BCCI president
 Ajay Sancheti, Former member of Rajya Sabha
 Vasant Sathe (1925–2011), former Minister of Information and Broadcasting
 V Satish, National Jt. General Secretary of Bharatiya Janata Party
 Abdul Shafee (1925-2004), former Indian National Congress politician
 Rajendra Shingne, state vice-president of Nationalist Congress Party
 Anil Sole, Member of Legislative Council, Nagpur graduates constituency
 Sumatitai Sukaklikar (?dash;2011), a leader of Bharatiya Janata Party
 Tahawar Ali (?dash;1854), noble in the court of Bhonsle Dynasty
 Vimla Verma, member of 12th Lok Sabha
 Mukul Wasnik, General Secretary of the Indian National Congress; former Union Minister
 Amit Telang, Indian Foreign Service, Diplomat

Religion and spirituality
 Tajuddin Muhammad Badruddin (1861–1925), Muslim Sufi master
 Eyre Chatterton (1863–1950), Anglican bishop
 Madhav Sadashiv Golwalkar (1906–1973), second Sarsanghchalak (Supreme Leader) of Rashtriya Swayamsevak Sangh
 Alec Hardy (1891–1970), Anglican bishop
 Keshav Baliram Hedgewar (1889–1940), founder of Rashtriya Swayamsevak Sangh
 Eknath Ranade (1914–1982), founder of Vivekananda Kendra
 George Sinker (1900–1986), Anglican bishop
 Alex Wood (1871–1937), Anglican bishop

Science
 Ramanath Cowsik, astrophysicist
 Ramesh Jain, scientist, professor and entrepreneur in the field of computer science
 Shekhar C. Mande, Shanti Swaroop Bhatnagar Award winner; scientist in the field of x-ray crystallography and biophysics
 S. Pancharatnam (1934–1969), physicist
Yashavant Kanetkar Computer Scientist largely responsible for popularizing the C programming  language in the whole of India. Author of several computer books including "Let Us C."

Sport
 Anilkumar Abhayankar, cricketer
 Shashank Manohar, Indian lawyer and President of the BCCI
 Mona Meshram, international cricket player
 C. K. Nayudu (1895–1967), first captain of the India national cricket team in Test matches
 Arundhati Pantawane, international badminton player
 R. T. Ramachandran, former cricket umpire
 N.K.P. Salve (1921–2012), former BCCI chief
 Rohit Sharma, Indian cricketer
 Azhar Sheikh, cricketer
 Prashant Vaidya, former Indian cricketer
 S. K. Wankhede (1914–1988), former BCCI president
 Umesh Yadav, Indian cricketer
Raunak Sadhwani, Chess Grandmaster
Divya Deshmukh, Chess player and Woman Grandmaster(WGM)
Malvika Bansod, badminton player
Mallika Bhandarkar , international table tennis player [ participated in Youth Olympic Games 2010]

See also
List of people from Maharashtra
List of Marathi people

References

 
Nagpur
Nagpur